Agnidra specularia is a moth in the family Drepanidae. It was described by Francis Walker in 1860. It is found in Sri Lanka, north-eastern India (Darjeeling, Assam, Sikkim), Bhutan, Vietnam and Xizang, China.

The wingspan is 19-22.5 mm for males and 24-25.5 mm for females.

Subspecies
Agnidra specularia specularia
Agnidra specularia xizanga H.F. Chu & L.Y. Wang, 1988 (China: Xizang)

References

Moths described in 1860
Drepaninae
Moths of Asia